Anastasia Tsilimpiou (born 12 November 1997) is a Greek-Romanian actress and model. She began her career at the age of five as a child actor and model. She is multilingual and can speak Greek, Romanian, English and Turkish. 

Tsilimpiou became particularly popular in Greece after her participation in the 2006 Greek television series Gia tin kardia enos angelou  and the hit Greek television series To Nisi. She played as blind child in theater. Tsilimpiou made her acting debut with a major role in the popular Turkish television series Muhteşem Yüzyıl: Kösem.

Early life
Tsilimpiou was born on 12 November 1997, in Athens to Viorel and Fotini Tsilimpiou. She has an older brother, Konstantinos. Her father is from Romania and her mother from Greece. At the age of 5, she began working as a child model by participating in advertisements and photo shoots for Greek magazines.

Filmography

Theater

Awards and nominations

References

External links
 

1997 births
21st-century Greek actresses
Actresses from Athens
Greek film actresses
Greek people of Romanian descent
Greek television actresses
Living people